Archibald Freebairn (1870 – 1917) was a Scottish footballer who played in the Football League for Bolton Wanderers. He featured on the losing side in the 1904 FA Cup Final.

His brothers Willie and David were also footballers, all three featuring for 	Partick Thistle.

References

1870 births
1917 deaths
Scottish footballers
People from Partick
Footballers from Glasgow
English Football League players
Scottish Football League players
Association football wing halves
Partick Thistle F.C. players
Bolton Wanderers F.C. players
FA Cup Final players